Al Gharbiyah ( 'western'), or Gharb ( 'west'), or variants may refer to:

 Al Gharbia, Abu Dhabi
 Western Region, Bahrain
 Għarb, Gozo, Malta
 Gharbia Governorate, Egypt
 Gharb Al-Andalus or Al-Gharb, former name of a region of modern-day Portugal and Spain 711–1249
 Gharb-Chrarda-Béni Hssen, or Gharb, a former region of Morocco
 Gharb Basin 
 Gharbia, Algeria

See also 
 Gharbi (disambiguation)
 Al-Janubiyah (disambiguation) (southern)
 Ash Shamaliyah (disambiguation) (northern)
 Ash Sharqiyah (disambiguation) (eastern)
 Al Wusta (disambiguation) (central)
 Western (disambiguation)
 Abu Ghraib, Iraq
 Algarve, Portugal
Cape Trafalgar